The Austro-Daimler Sascha (also called Sascha or Sascha Porsche) is a car from 1922. It was designed by the [Austrian, Czechoslovakian and German car, truck, aviation motor and tank designer]  Ferdinand Porsche. The car was named by Ferdinand Porsche after Count Sascha Kolowrat-Krakowsky, a friend who had encouraged him greatly to build a small, lightweight sports car, and who also personally financed the project.

In that period, Porsche still worked for the Austrian Austro-Daimler and designed a small, lightweight sports car of 1100 cc that was revolutionary for its time. It had a four cylinder engine with 8 inclined overhead valves and bevel-driven dual overhead camshafts, preceding the bevel drive of the later Fuhrmann engine in some Porsche 356 Carrera models. The motor had a very wide crankcase with a cast flat surface all along the two members of the ladder frame to which it was bolted rigidly in the same fashion as the big 6 Cylinder Hispano Suiza cars. The engine of the Sascha had a capacity of 1100 cc and produced 50 horsepower, which was quite a lot for that time. 

The car achieved a top speed of 144 km/h. For racing, the fender and spotlight could be removed. Surviving examples of this vehicle show staggered bucket seats for the driver and mechanic and the absence of a tail body. In most period photographs, the rear suspension, brakes and differential are exposed, though some also show a variant with a small torpedo tail being used. For the Targa Florio race of 1922, three Saschas were sent to Sicily.

By comparison, the overall winner of the Targa Florio in 1922 won in a Mercedes at an average of 63 km/h while the car was equipped with a much more powerful engine.

Sources 
 Wood, J (1997). Porsche:The Legend. Parragon. .

External links 
 

Porsche
Daimler Motoren Gesellschaft
Sascha